Aplysia juliana, the walking sea hare, is a species of sea hare, a marine gastropod in the family Aplysiidae.

Distribution
Distribution of this species is cosmopolitan, circumtropical in all warm seas.

Description
This sea hare has no purple gland and therefore cannot produce ink, just milky secretions. The posterior end of the foot in this species can act as a sucker.

The color of this sea hare is very often brown with paler spots, but it can be various other shades including plain black all over.

The maximum recorded length is 300 mm.

A. juliana inhabits tidal pools and seagrass beds, to a depth of 20 metres.

References

Further reading 
 Bebbington A. (1974) Aplysiid species from East Africa with notes on the Indian Ocean Aplysiomorpha (Gastropoda: Opisthobranchia). Zoological Journal of the Linnean Society 54(1): 63–99. 
 Bebbington A. (1977) Aplysiid species from Eastern Australia with notes on the Pacific Ocean Aplysiomorpha (Gastropoda, Opisthobranchia). Transactions of the Zoological Society of London 34: 87-147
 Gofas, S.; Le Renard, J.; Bouchet, P. (2001). Mollusca, in: Costello, M.J. et al. (Ed.) (2001). European register of marine species: a check-list of the marine species in Europe and a bibliography of guides to their identification. Collection Patrimoines Naturels, 50: pp. 180–213 
 Branch, G.M. et al. (2002). Two Oceans. 5th impression. David Philip, Cate Town & Johannesburg
 Rosenberg, G., F. Moretzsohn, and E. F. García. 2009. Gastropoda (Mollusca) of the Gulf of Mexico, Pp. 579–699 in Felder, D.L. and D.K. Camp (eds.), Gulf of Mexico–Origins, Waters, and Biota. Biodiversity. Texas A&M Press, College Station, Texas

juliana
Gastropods described in 1832